Thomas Lister, 1st Baron Ribblesdale (22 March 1752 – 22 September 1826) of Gisburne Park, Yorkshire, was a British landowner and politician who represented Clitheroe in the House of Commons between 1773 and 1790 and was raised to the peerage as Baron Ribblesdale in 1797.

Early life
Lister was born on 22 March 1752, the son of Thomas Lister (1723–61) of Gisburne Park, Yorkshire, and his wife Beatrix Hulton. His father was MP for Clitheroe from 1745 to 1763. He was educated at Westminster School and matriculated at Brasenose College, Oxford on 2 May 1769, aged 17. He gained the MA (an academic rank and not a postgraduate qualification - the BA is converted into an MA) on 26 June 1772, and later a DCL on 8 July 1773.

Career
In 1773, he was elected Member of Parliament for Clitheroe and retained the seat in the 1774 General Election. When the American war broke out, he fitted out a frigate at his own expense and placed it at the disposal of the Government. In 1779 he raised Lister's Light Dragoons, a regiment of horse and was gazetted major in the army. He was re-elected to parliament for Clitheroe in 1780 and 1784.

Family

Lister married Rebecca Feilding, daughter of Joseph Feilding, on 7 November 1789 at St James the Less, Thorndike Street, Pimlico, London. He was pricked as High Sheriff of Yorkshire in 1794–5. He was created Baron Ribblesdale, of Gisburne Park, Yorkshire on 28 October 1797. He died on 22 September 1826 at age 74.

Arms

References

1752 births
1826 deaths
People from Ribble Valley (district)
People educated at Westminster School, London
Alumni of Brasenose College, Oxford
Members of the Parliament of Great Britain for constituencies in Lancashire
British MPs 1768–1774
British MPs 1774–1780
British MPs 1780–1784
British MPs 1784–1790
Barons Ribblesdale
Peers of Great Britain created by George III
High Sheriffs of Yorkshire